Edward Lloyd (by 1508 – 1547) was an English politician.

Lloyd was an MP for Buckingham in 1529. He was yeoman of the wardrobe to Queen Anne Boleyn. In 1545, he was a member of the household of Catherine Parr, the sixth wife of Henry VIII. There is confusion in identifying Lloyd, and his surname may have been Sooll, Powell or Floyd.

References

1547 deaths
English MPs 1529–1536
Year of birth uncertain